American country music artist Jo Dee Messina has released six studio albums, two compilation albums, three extended plays, and 33 singles. She signed with Curb Records and released her self-titled debut album in 1996. The album spawned two top-ten hits: "Heads Carolina, Tails California" and "You're Not in Kansas Anymore". Messina's second studio album I'm Alright was released in March 1998. The album peaked at number five on the Billboard Top Country Albums chart and number sixty one on the Billboard 200 list. The album produced three number one Billboard Hot Country Songs singles: "Bye Bye, "I'm Alright", and "Stand Beside Me". Messina's third studio release Burn was issued in March 2000. Not only becoming her first number-one album on the country albums chart, it also peaked at number nineteen on the Billboard 200. It would later certify platinum from the RIAA. The album's lead single "That's the Way" became her fourth number one single on the Hot Country Songs chart. Burn also spawned "Bring on the Rain" (which included vocals from Tim McGraw) and became Messina's fifth number-one country song.

After the release of a holiday album in 2002 and a greatest hits project in 2003, Messina went on a temporary recording hiatus. In April 2005, she issued her fifth studio album Delicious Surprise, which certified gold from the RIAA and debuted at number one on the Billboard country albums chart. The album's lead single "My Give a Damn's Busted" became her sixth number one single on the Billboard country songs chart. Messina then issued a series of minor hit singles and was anticipating the release of a new album entitled Unmistakable. The album went unreleased and was replaced with a series of extended plays in 2010. Leaving Curb Records, she established a Kickstarter campaign to fund her sixth studio album. Me was released in March 2014 and debuted at number 19 on the Top Country Albums chart.

Albums

Studio albums

Compilation albums

Extended plays

Singles

Other charted songs

Videography

Video albums

Music videos

Notes

References

External links
 Jo Dee Messina full discography at Discogs

Country music discographies
 
 
Discographies of American artists